John Nicholson may refer to:

In politics
John Nicholson (Yarmouth MP), Member of Parliament for Great Yarmouth 1698–1700, 1702–08
John Nicholson (New York politician) (1765–1820), United States Representative from New York
John A. Nicholson (1827–1906), United States Representative from Delaware
John Nicholson (New South Wales politician) (1840–1919), New South Wales politician
John Robert Nicholson (1901–1983), Canadian former Lieutenant-Governor of British Columbia
John Sanctuary Nicholson (1863–1924), British politician and soldier
John Nicholson (Western Australian politician) (1867–1941), Western Australian politician

In sports
John Nicholson (footballer, born 1936) (1936–1966), English footballer
John Nicholson (Scottish footballer) (1888–1970), Scottish footballer
John Nicholson (racing driver) (1941–2017), New Zealand racing driver
John Nicholson (football secretary) (1864–1932), 'manager' of Sheffield United F.C.
John Nicholson (athlete) (1889–1940), American track and field athlete
John Nicholson (cyclist) (born 1949), cyclist from Australia
John Nicholson (Cambridge University cricketer) (1822–1861), English cricketer, played for Cambridge University in 1845
John Nicholson (Northamptonshire cricketer) (1903–1950), English cricketer, played for Northamptonshire
Jack Nicholson (footballer) (1892–1967), former Australian rules footballer

In military
John Nicholson (East India Company officer) (1821–1857), Irish-born military figure known as the "Hero of Delhi"
John Nicholson (naval officer) (1756–1844), Continental Navy officer during the American Revolution
John W. Nicholson (born c. 1934), retired U.S. Army general
John W. Nicholson Jr. (born 1957), U.S. Army general

In other fields
John Nicholson (poet) (1790–1843), 'The Airedale Poet'
John Nicholson (orientalist) (1809–1886), English independent scholar
John Henry Nicholson (1838–1923), Australian writer
John William Nicholson (1881–1955), English mathematician
Sir John Rumney Nicholson (1866–1939), British engineer
John Nicholson (author), Australian children's author
 John Nicholson, engine driver and contributor to the invention of the compound steam locomotive
Jack Nicholson (John Nicholson, born 1937), American actor
John Lambert (martyr) (John Nicholson, died 1538), English Protestant martyr
John Nicholson (priest) (1908–1983), Archdeacon of Doncaster from 1955 to 1959
John Beauchamp Nicholson (1852–?), architect in Brisbane, Queensland, Australia
John H. Nicholson (1889–1972), vice-chancellor of the University of Hull
Sir John Nicholson, 2nd Baronet (1911–1993), Lord Lieutenant of the Isle of Wight
John Gambril Nicholson (1866–1931), English schoolteacher, poet, and amateur photographer

See also
John Nicolson (disambiguation)
Jack Nicholson (born 1937), American actor